Daniel O'Connor (31 January 1864 – 30 March 1933) was a Canadian politician, businessman and prospector from Pembroke, Ontario. In the late 1880s, O'Connor moved to Sudbury where he became associated with economy, life and industry, becoming the town's second mayor in 1894. Later, O'Connor travelled north where he founded the town of Temagami and opened Lady Evelyn Hotel, the Temagami Inn and Ronnoco Hotel.

When O'Connor moved to Temagami, he was hoping to find some mineral prospects. In 1899, O'Connor created test pits in east-central Strathy Township that later became Big Dan Mine, which is named after him. Other mines in Temagami that bare his name are Little Dan at Arsenic Lake and O'Connor near Lake Temagami. O'Connor continued to move northwards where he discovered deposits of gold. He moved to Connaught, Ontario and ran a general store.

Personal life
O'Connor was born in Pembroke, Ontario to Patrick O'Connor, and the family moved to Sudbury when he was young. His brother Larry was also a mayor of Sudbury.

On 30 March 1933, O'Connor died at St. Mary's hospital in the city of Timmins where his daughter was living, after being hospitalized there for a week. The cause of his death was bronchopneumonia. He was survived by his wife and his daughter, Jos. Clemens.

References

External links
The Business Pioneer

Canadian gold prospectors
Businesspeople from Greater Sudbury
1864 births
1933 deaths
People from Pembroke, Ontario
People from Temagami
Mayors of Sudbury, Ontario
Deaths from bronchopneumonia